João Marcos Alves Ferreira (born 24 June 1981 in Marília), known as João Marcos, is a Brazilian former professional footballer who played as a defensive midfielder.

Honours
Ceará
Campeonato Cearense: 2011, 2012, 2013, 2014
Copa do Nordeste: 2015

References

External links
 
 
 

Living people
1981 births
Association football midfielders
Brazilian footballers
Campeonato Brasileiro Série A players
Marília Atlético Clube players
Associação Atlética Ponte Preta players
Ceará Sporting Club players